New York's 8th State Senate district is one of 63 districts in the New York State Senate. It has been represented by Democrat John Brooks since 2017, following Brooks' defeat of incumbent Republican Michael Venditto.

Geography
District 8 straddles the South Shore of Long Island in Nassau County and Suffolk County, including portions of Babylon, Oyster Bay, and Hempstead.

The district overlaps with U.S. congressional districts 2 and 4, and with New York State Assembly districts 9, 10, 11, 14, 17, 18, and 21.

Recent election results

2020

2018

2016

2014

2012

Federal results in District 8

References

08